Jack Doyle may refer to:

Jack Doyle (boxer) (1913–1978), Irish boxer, actor, and tenor
Jack Doyle (baseball) (1869–1958), Irish-American first baseman in Major League Baseball
Jack Doyle (American football) (born 1990), American football tight end
Jack Doyle (equestrian) (born 1958), Irish Olympic equestrian
Jack Doyle (footballer) (born 1997), English footballer
Jack Doyle (journalist), British journalist
Jack Doyle (basketball), see Dave Boots
Jack Doyle (horse), in Scilly Isles Novices' Chase

See also
Jack Boyle (disambiguation)
John Doyle (disambiguation)